The 2013 2. deild karla (English: Men's Second Division) is the 48th season of third-tier football in Iceland. Twelve teams will contest the league, which as of 2013 is no longer the lowest national division in Iceland following the restructuring of the league pyramid. The fixtures for the 2013 campaign were released by the KSÍ on 10 November 2012; play began on 10 May and concluded on 21 September.

The league champions were HK, who finished ahead of second-placed KV on goal difference. Both clubs were therefore promoted to the 1. deild for the 2014 season. At the other end of the table, Hamar and Höttur were both relegated to the 2014 3. deild karla.

Teams
The league will be contested by twelve clubs, eight of which played in the division during the 2012 season. There are four new clubs from the previous campaign:
Höttur and ÍR were relegated from the 2012 1. deild karla, replacing KF and Völsungur who were promoted to the 2013 1. deild karla
Ægir and Sindri were promoted from the 2012 3. deild karla, in place of Fjarðabyggð and KFR who were relegated to the 2013 3. deild karla

Club information

League table

Results
Each team plays every opponent once home and away for a total of 22 matches per club, and 132 matches altogether.

References

2. deild karla seasons
Iceland
Iceland
3